Leiocephalus punctatus, commonly known as the Crooked-Acklins curlytail or spotted curlytail lizard, is a species of lizard in the family Leiocephalidae (curly-tailed lizard). It is native to the Bahamas.

References

Leiocephalus
Reptiles described in 1931
Reptiles of the Bahamas
Taxa named by Doris Mable Cochran